Illinois Route 151 is a north–south state road in southern Illinois located entirely within Jackson County. It runs from Illinois Route 3 in rural Jackson County to Illinois Route 4 in Ava.

Route description 
Illinois 151 serves as a connector through the northwest portion of Shawnee National Forest. It also is the access road to the Jackson Creek Recreational Area.

History 
SBI Route 151 originally ran from Steeleville to Murphysboro; this was absorbed into Illinois Route 43 in 1937, and eventually became part of Illinois 4 in 1964. In 1940, Illinois 151 was placed onto its current route.

Major intersections

References

External links

151
Transportation in Jackson County, Illinois